Maquoketa Community High School is a public high school in Maquoketa, Iowa, United States. It is located at 600 Washington, Maquoketa, Iowa.

It is the only high school in the Maquoketa Community School District.

Athletics
The Cardinals compete in the WaMaC Conference in the following sports:

Baseball
 Class 3A State champions - 1983 
Basketball (boys and girls)
Bowling
Cross Country (boys and girls)
 Girls' Class 2A State Champions - 1986, 1995 
Football
Golf (boys and girls)
 Girls' State Champions - 1989, 2004
Soccer (boys and girls)
Softball
Swimming (boys and girls)
Tennis (boys and girls)
Track and Field (boys and girls)
Volleyball
Wrestling

See also
List of high schools in Iowa

Notable alumni

Tod Bowman, Former State Senator for Iowa and Government teacher at the school.
Robert A. Millikan, Nobel Prize of Science winner
Sage Rosenfels, quarterback in the NFL
William Welch, inventor of the High School Diploma

References

Public high schools in Iowa
Maquoketa, Iowa
Schools in Jackson County, Iowa